Diorocetus is an extinct genus of baleen whale, belonging to the family Diorocetidae. Fossils are found in Miocene-aged marine strata in North America and Japan.

References 

Miocene cetaceans
Prehistoric cetacean genera
Miocene mammals of Asia
Miocene mammals of North America